The Xiangshuijian Pumped Storage Power Station is a pumped-storage hydroelectric power station located  southwest of Wuhu City in Sanshan District of Anhui Province, China. Construction on the power station began on 8 December 2006 and the upper reservoir dam was completed in October 2010. The first unit was commissioned on 1 December 2011 and the last on 17 November 2012. The power station operates by shifting water between an upper and lower reservoir to generate electricity. The lower reservoir was formed with the creation of the Xiangshuijian Lower Dam in a valley. The Xiangshuijian Upper Reservoir is in another valley above the west side of the lower reservoir. During periods of low energy demand, such as at night, water is pumped from Xiangshuijian Lower Reservoir up to the upper reservoir. When energy demand is high, the water is released back down to the lower reservoir but the pump turbines that pumped the water up now reverse mode and serve as generators to produce electricity. The process is repeated as necessary and the plant serves as a peaking power plant.

Water from the upper reservoir is sent to the  underground power station down near the lower reservoir through headrace/penstock pipes.

See also

List of pumped-storage power stations

References

Dams completed in 2010
Energy infrastructure completed in 2012
Dams in China
Pumped-storage hydroelectric power stations in China
Hydroelectric power stations in Anhui
Concrete-face rock-fill dams
2012 establishments in China
Buildings and structures in Wuhu
Underground power stations